Madi may refer to several unrelated languages:
 Madí language, an Arawan language of Brazil
 Ma'di language, a Nilo-Saharan language of Uganda and South Sudan
 Gira language, also known as Madi, a language of the Finisterre family spoken in Papua New Guinea

See also 
 Madi Madi language, a language of Australia